"I Wish I Was James Bond" is the fifth single from English pop rock band Scouting for Girls' debut album, Scouting for Girls. It is the 10th track on the album and is followed by a hidden track called "Michaela Strachan You Broke My Heart (When I Was 12)". The single peaked at number 40 in the UK Singles Chart.

Lyrical content
The song is about the spy James Bond from Ian Fleming's books and the James Bond movies and his world in general (girls, gadgets, 00 status, licence to kill and vodka martinis). It mentions six of the actors who played as him and a lyric of the song is the 19th movie's title, The World Is Not Enough. It also references Bond's family motto invented by Ian Fleming in On Her Majesty's Secret Service.

Music video
The music video has the band playing in tuxedos on a white stage whilst there are men and women dancing to the side of the band.

Charts

Certifications

References

External links
 Music Video

2007 songs
2008 singles
Epic Records singles
Scouting for Girls songs
Songs written by Roy Stride
Sony BMG singles